Kümbet may refer to:

 Gonbad, an architectural feature, specifically a Seljuc mausoleum
Kümbet, Karakoçan
Kümbet, Gölpazarı, village in Bilecik province, Turkey
Kümbet, Ortaköy, village in Aksaray province, Turkey
Kümbet, Seyitgazi, village in Eskişehir Province, Turkey